The men's 61 kilograms competition at the 2022 World Weightlifting Championships was held on 6 and 7 December 2022.

Schedule

Medalists

Records

Results

References

Men's 61 kg